Hannu Wilhelm Haapalainen (February 28, 1951 – November 5, 2011) was a Finnish professional ice hockey player who played in the SM-liiga.  He played for Tappara and KooVee and won five league championships. He was inducted into the Finnish Hockey Hall of Fame in 1992.

External links
 Finnish Hockey Hall of Fame bio
 

1951 births
2011 deaths
Düsseldorfer EG players
Finnish ice hockey defencemen
Ice hockey players at the 1976 Winter Olympics
Ice hockey players at the 1980 Winter Olympics
Kölner Haie players
KOOVEE players
Olympic ice hockey players of Finland
Tappara players
People from Nokia, Finland
Sportspeople from Pirkanmaa
20th-century Finnish people